Normanna can refer to:
 Normanna, Texas
 Normanna Township, Minnesota